Aaron Parry is an American synagogue rabbi, counter-missionary expert, and author of several beginners books on Judaism.

He was formerly the Rabbi of Young Israel of Beverly Hills. He is the former education director for the West Coast branch of Jews for Judaism, and has been quoted as an expert on Jewish counter-missionary activity.

Parry has a master's degree in Jewish studies from New York State University. He currently teaches at Shalhevet High School in Los Angeles. A few days each season, since 2000, he sets up and manages a kosher food stand at Dodger Stadium.

Bibliography 
 The Complete Idiot's Guide to the Talmud (Alpha Books, 2004) - reviewed by The Jewish Journal
 The Complete Idiot's Guide to Hebrew Scripture (Alpha Books, 2004)

References

American Orthodox rabbis
Living people
Writers from Los Angeles
Jewish American writers
Year of birth missing (living people)
21st-century American rabbis